Sawbridgeworth Marsh is a  biological Site of Special Scientific Interest (SSSI) near Sawbridgeworth in Hertfordshire, apart from a small area in the north which is in Essex. It is managed by the Essex Wildlife Trust. The planning authorities are East Hertfordshire District Council and Uttlesford District Council.

The site is a river valley marsh close to the River Stort, which has a varied wetland flora. Grazing and cutting of the marsh in rotation maintain biological diversity. The site also has an important wetland fauna and many moth species. Uncommon plants include marsh willowherb, marsh valerian and marsh arrow-grass, and drainage ditches and two ponds have a rich aquatic life.

The site is always open and there is access from Hallingbury Road.

Notes

References

Sites of Special Scientific Interest in Hertfordshire
Essex Wildlife Trust
East Hertfordshire District